Melanotus communis is a species of click beetle. The larva is a short-legged wireworm. The pupa is white in color, and is about the same size as an adult.

References

Elateridae
Beetles of North America
Beetles described in 1817